The 1918 Tie Cup Final was the final match to decide the winner of the Tie Cup, the 19th. edition of the international competition organised by the Argentine and Uruguayan Associations together. The final was contested by Argentine side Porteño and Uruguayan club Wanderers,

In the match, played at Gimnasia y Esgrima in Palermo, Buenos Aires, Wanderers beat Porteño 2–1, winning its third Tie Cup trophy (and second consecutive).

Qualified teams

Overview 
Porteño earned its place in the final as the winner of 1918 Copa de Competencia Jockey Club, after beating Gimnasia y Esgrima (4–0), Almagro (4–2), Estudiantes de Buenos Aires (2–0), Ferro Carril Oeste (4–1)</ref> Tiro Federal (2–1 in the semifinal) and River Plate (2–1 in the final). As a curious fact, Porteño played all its matches in Palermo.

There were no goals in the first half. On 52 minutes, Pérez, in offside position, made a pass that Buffoni connected to the first goal. Four minutes later, Pérez again sent a pass that was weakily rebounded by Arrieta, allowing Landeira to score the second goal for Wanderers. The only goal of Porteño was scored by Uslenghi by a penalty kick awarded after both backs of Wanderers fouled Clark.

With that result, Wanderers crowned champion, achieving its third Tie Cup trophy.

Match details

References

t
1918 in Argentine football
1918 in Uruguayan football
Football in Buenos Aires